KAUS (1480 kHz) is an AM radio station that broadcasts a news and information format. Licensed to Austin, Minnesota, United States, the station serves the Mower County area. The station is currently owned by Alpha Media, through licensee Alpha 3E Licensee LLC Debtor-in-Possession.

History
KAUS began broadcasting May 30, 1948, on 1480 kHz with 1 KW power (full-time). It was a Mutual affiliate, owned by Cedar Valley Broadcasting Company, Incorporated. Studios were at 405 North Main Street.

KAUS' transmitter site is adjacent to its studios south of Austin. It originally began broadcasting with the call letters of KAAL and housed the earliest incarnation of the television station known today as KAAL (formerly KAUS-TV) in its rural Austin studios. KAUS AM had been on the air since at least the mid 60's  with a pop/top 40 format and the TV station was KMMT, an ABC affiliate.

Personalities
Bob Abbott was host of the "1480 Club" 1948-1952.

The radio station's notable personality is "Champagne" Duane Germaine whose tenure at the station has surpassed all others.

References

External links

Radio stations in Minnesota
News and talk radio stations in the United States
Radio stations established in 1948
1948 establishments in Minnesota
Alpha Media radio stations